The COVID-19 pandemic spread to many military ships. The nature of these ships, which includes working with others in small enclosed areas and a lack of private quarters for the vast majority of crew, contributed to the rapid spread of the disease, even more so than on cruise ships.

Due to the nature of operations security, national militaries may have policies in place that prevent or restrict reporting of SARS-CoV-2 infections and COVID-19 deaths, so although the cases listed below may have been widely reported in reliable sources, confirmation by official spokespeople of the respective militaries is not systematic.

Summary of confirmed cases

Belgium

Leopold I  

On 25 March, Belgian Defense reported that a crew member of the Belgian frigate  had tested positive. The sailor had been evacuated via air to Den Helder on 20 March after he began showing symptoms, and was quarantined at home when the test returned positive on 24 March. As a precaution, the ship broke off from its operation with the French carrier battle group led by Charles de Gaulle and returned to Zeebrugge, its home port, on 27 March, about a month earlier than planned.

France

Carrier battle group of Charles de Gaulle  

Because about 40 crew members were beginning to show symptoms, the French aircraft carrier  returned to its home port in Toulon earlier than planned, as reported on 8 April 2020 by the Ministry of Armed Forces. Other ships that were part of the carrier battle group also began to return to their home ports.

After 66 sailors aboard Charles de Gaulle were tested, the ministry announced on 10 April that 50 tests had returned positive.

The carrier had been on a months-long mission leading a carrier battle group when its first coronavirus case was reported. Another ship participating in the mission, Belgium's Leopold I, had broken off to return to port weeks earlier due to a case of coronavirus being found on board.

On 12 April 2020, the Marine Nationale reported that Charles de Gaulle and accompanying air-defense frigate  had returned to Toulon, while command and replenishment tanker  and anti-submarine frigate  had returned to Brest. The 1,700 sailors of Charles de Gaulle and 200 sailors of Chevalier Paul were subsequently quarantined for two weeks.

On 15 April, the Ministry of Armed Forces reported that, out of the 1,767 tests that had been conducted on the members of the carrier battle group so far, 668 had returned positive.  The vast majority of these cases were aboard Charles de Gaulle, and the remainder of the cases were reported to be aboard Chevalier Paul.

On 17 April, Central Director of the Military Health Service, reported to the  that all 2,300 sailors of the carrier battle group had been tested upon their return to Toulon, and so far, 940 had tested positive while 645 had tested negative. On the same day, Florence Parly, Minister of the Armed Forces, reported to the National Assembly's  that 2,010 sailors of the carrier battle group had been tested, with 1,081 tests returning positive so far. The Navy clarified that, on Charles de Gaulle itself, the final number was 1,046 positive cases out of 1,760 tested.

In total, 545 sailors had shown symptoms and 24 had been hospitalized at the Saint Anne Army Teaching Hospital, including 2 admitted to the ICU.

On 29 April 2020, the Navy stated that 19 sailors aboard Chevalier Paul had tested positive upon arrival at Toulon.

On 11 May 2020, Florence Parly reported to the National Assembly the conclusions of two investigations into the outbreak on board the carrier, stating that the virus had first arrived before a stopover made in Brest, and that although the command and medical team aboard the carrier had "excessive confidence" in their ability to deal with the virus, the investigations did not consider them at fault.

Parly further explained that the introduction of the virus on board the carrier happened sometime between when it left Limassol, Cyprus, on 26 February 2020, and when it arrived at Brest on 13 March 2020. During this time, personnel had been brought on board via air from either Cyprus, Sicily, the Balearic Islands, Spain, or Portugal. The spread of the virus, however, was exacerbated by the stopover at Brest. Social distancing and other measures were taken after the stopover, but they weighed heavily on crew morale, so after enforcing the strict measures for a fortnight, they were relaxed, and a concert on board was authorized for 30 March.

Parly also noted that all soldiers aboard Charles de Gaulle have since recovered from the disease except for one sailor, who was still hospitalized after leaving the ICU.

Netherlands

HNLMS Dolfijn  

On 30 March 2020, the Ministry of Defence reported that eight crew members of the Dutch submarine  had tested positive. Out of 58 crew members, 15 sailors with mild symptoms were tested. The submarine changed course near Scotland to return to the Netherlands two weeks early, arriving in Den Helder on 3 April.

Philippines

BRP Jose Rizal 

On , Navy Chief Vice admiral Giovanni Bacordo announced that one of the 65 crew members of the Philippine Navy missile frigate  tested positive for COVID-19, causing the postponement of the ship's commissioning. The frigate had sailed from Hyundai Heavy Industries' shipyard in Ulsan, South Korea with its crew on 18 May. It had arrived at the Subic Bay anchorage area on 23 May and remained there to fulfill mandatory quarantine and swab testing requirements. The ship docked at the Port of Subic Bay in Zambales on  but the whole crew had to undergo 14 days of additional quarantine from the time the ship's sole case tested positive.

On , the Philippine News Agency reported that, following the commissioning ceremony, two crew members of BRP Jose Rizal had tested positive for the virus and had been evacuated to a quarantine facility on shore.

Taiwan

ROCS Pan Shi   

All three cadets were in their 20s, with one case showing symptoms as early as 12 April before seeking medical attention on 15 April, when the ship returned to Taiwan. There were 337 people aboard the same ship as the cadets. Over 700 sailors serving in the three-ship fleet have been placed in quarantine.

A Dunmu fleet is formed annually, and this iteration of the Dunmu fleet was formed on 20 February 2020 consisting of the following three ships:
 ROCS Pan Shi (磐石), a fast combat support ship and the flagship of the fleet,
 , a frigate, and
 , a frigate.
The three cadets had boarded the ship on 21 February, and the fleet left  on 5 March 2020 for a goodwill visit with Palau. The fleet stayed at Palau from 12 to 15 March 2020, although the size restrictions at the port in Palau meant that only Kang Ding entered the port. After departing Palau, the fleet remained at sea for roughly a month before returning to Zuoying Naval Base on 15 April.

On 19 April, Taiwan announced that a further 21 sailors of the Dunmu fleet had tested positive. More cases from Pan Shi continued to be identified, eventually reaching a total of 36. On 26 May, Chang Shan-chwen, an adviser to the Central Epidemic Command Center, stated that the index case on the Pan Shi was likely to have been infected in Taiwan.

The goodwill mission has been criticized for pictures of sailors not wearing masks appearing on social media. Vice Admiral , Navy Deputy Commander, stated that as Palau had no reported cases of coronavirus at the time, such a decision was made after consulting with Taiwan's embassy in Palau.

United States 

On 23 April 2020, the United States Navy reported that at least one coronavirus case had been found on 26 of its battle force ships. In addition, on 28 April 2020, the Navy reported that "[o]f the more than 90 U.S. Navy ships at sea around the world today, none have active COVID-19 cases".

USS Boxer  

The coronavirus pandemic was reported to have spread to the American amphibious assault ship  when its first presumptive positive case was reported on 15 March 2020. This was reported as the first case for a sailor aboard a United States Navy ship. The sailor subsequently quarantined at home. A second sailor tested positive on 17 March 2020 and also quarantined at home.

USS Essex  

The coronavirus pandemic was reported to have spread to the crew of the American landing helicopter dock  when its first case was reported on 17 March. The sailor had been attending a course at Naval Base San Diego since 6 February 2020 when the test returned positive on 14 March. The student subsequently self-isolated at home.

USS Ralph Johnson  

On 17 March 2020, United States Pacific Fleet reported that a crew member of the American destroyer  had tested positive the previous day. USS Ralph Johnson was at its home port in Everett, Washington at the time, and the sailor self-isolated at home.

USS Coronado  

On 17 March 2020, United States Pacific Fleet reported that a crew member of the American littoral combat ship  had tested positive that day. USS Coronado was at its home port in San Diego, California at the time, and the sailor self-isolated at home.

By , nine sailors had tested positive, and more than thirty sailors, or roughly half of the crew, had their movements restricted.

USS Carl Vinson  

The coronavirus pandemic was reported to have spread to the crew of the American aircraft carrier  when its first case was reported on 23 March 2020. At the time, the ship was in dry dock at Puget Sound Naval Shipyard, and it was reported that "the sailor did not board the vessel and had no contact with any shipyard personnel".

USS Theodore Roosevelt  

The coronavirus pandemic was reported to have spread to the American aircraft carrier  when its first three cases were reported on 24 March 2020. As of 5 May 2020, 1,156 crewmembers have tested positive, with one fatality. The Navy has said they will no longer report public tallies of coronavirus cases on the USS Theodore Roosevelt. Initial testing was completed by 27 April 2020, at which point, 969 crew members had tested positive, and 14 of those 969 had recovered.  By 29 April 2020, the bulk of the ship had been cleaned, and sailors that were previously quarantined on Guam began moving back to the ship.

This was the first instance of coronavirus being found aboard an American naval ship that had been deployed.

USS Ronald Reagan  

The coronavirus pandemic was reported to have spread to the American aircraft carrier  when its first two cases were reported on 27 March 2020. The positive cases forced the closure of the naval base outside Tokyo where the carrier is based, with all personnel on base told to stay indoors for 48 hours. By 23 April 2020, 16 sailors had tested positive.

USNS Comfort  

The coronavirus pandemic was reported to have spread to the American hospital ship  when its first case was reported on 7 April 2020. The ship had arrived in Manhattan on 20 March with the intention of treating patients for ailments other than coronavirus so that local hospitals could concentrate on coronavirus cases. However, officials announced on 7 April that the ship's mission had changed and 500 of the ship's 1,000 beds would be allocated for severe coronavirus cases. In addition, as all crew members had tested negative before the ship set sail from Virginia and no crew had left the ship since arriving in New York, it was unclear how the crew member, who is not a medical worker and had no contact with patients, got infected.

It was later revealed that two civil service mariners aboard USNS Comfort had been infected, but both have since recovered.

Comfort departed on 30 April, having treated 179 patients.

USS Nimitz  

The coronavirus pandemic was reported to have spread to the American aircraft carrier  when its first case was reported on 7 April 2020. One sailor received a positive result the previous week after exhibiting symptoms, and was subsequently placed in isolation and removed from the ship. Another crew member has also tested positive, but is reported to have not been working on the ship.

On 27 April, USS Nimitz completed a 27-day quarantine and began COMPTUEX training.

USNS Mercy  

The COVID-19 pandemic spread to the US navy hospital ship  when its first case was reported on 8 April 2020. It is unclear how the crew member became infected, as the crew member had not interacted with any patients, all crew members had been screened before boarding the ship in San Diego and had not been allowed to leave the ship since, and the ship was only treating patients for ailments other than COVID-19, requiring a negative SARS-CoV-2 test result before any patient was allowed to board the ship.

As of 14 April 2020, 7 medical staff members had tested positive, and the Navy had removed 116 medical staff members from the ship in response.

USS Tripoli  

On 17 April 2020, The Wall Street Journal reported that Navy officials had stated that at least 9 sailors assigned to American amphibious assault ship  had tested positive for the virus. At the time, USS Tripoli was docked in Pascagoula, Mississippi, where it had been built by Ingalls Shipbuilding.  About 630 sailors were moved off the ship as a preventative measure, which resulted in the outbreak spreading to only "around a couple dozen sailors".

USS Kidd  

On 24 April 2020, the United States Navy reported that a sailor assigned to American destroyer  had tested positive for the virus after being medically evacuated the previous day from operations at sea. After the sailor's test returned positive, the Navy sent a medical team to the ship to conduct contact tracing and test sailors for the virus on board. By the morning of 24 April 2020, 17 additional sailors had tested positive, with additional cases expected as testing continued.

The initial patient was stable and recovering at a medical facility in San Antonio, Texas. In total, two sailors have been medically evacuated. Sailors are wearing PPE and N95 masks. , an amphibious assault ship with a Fleet Surgical Team, an intensive care unit, and ventilators, headed to the ship in case additional medical capacity was required. USS Kidd began to return to port in San Diego for disinfection.

At the time the first sailor was medically evacuated from the ship, USS Kidd had been part of an operation to prevent drug trafficking near South America. It had been at sea since January. A second sailor was later medically evacuated to the states as well.

On 25 April 2020, the Navy reported that 33 positive cases had been found. By 27 April 2020, 45% of the crew members had been tested, with 47 total positive cases reported, and 15 sailors transferred to USS Makin Island for additional monitoring. By 28 April 2020, 64 had tested positive, and USS Kidd had docked in San Diego that afternoon to be disinfected, a process that might take up to two weeks. It is expected that eventually, all sailors on board will be tested for the virus.

This was the second instance of coronavirus being found aboard an American naval ship that had been deployed.

USNS Leroy Grumman  

On 30 April 2020, USNI News reported that two civilian mariners on American fleet replenishment oiler  had been infected with the virus. The ship had been docked in Boston since January for scheduled maintenance by Boston Ship Repair until the end of May. The source of the infection was unclear, but a spokesperson for Military Sealift Command (MSC) stated that there were outside contractors at the shipyard who had tested positive earlier.

By 5 May 18 sailors had tested positive, including the ship's medic. About 50 people were on board and all were placed under quarantine.

On 19 May 2020, the Project On Government Oversight and The Daily Beast reported that 22 crew members and 30 contractors had tested positive for the virus, and that a 60-year-old contractor who worked in the engine room had died of the virus. In addition, it was reported that mariners had complained about how MSC was "being reactive rather than proactive", and that, despite the issuance of a gangway up order that required all civilian mariners on leave to return to the ship and prevented all mariners from leaving the ship, contractors and other personnel were allowed to embark and disembark with virtually no restrictions, except for random temperature checks and a self-report questionnaire. The ship was eventually vacated on 8 May for seven days.

On 21 May 2020, a civilian mariner was declared dead due to complications of the virus. He was hospitalized on 30 April 2020, and was placed on a ventilator in an ICU on 4 May 2020. The deceased was the first civilian mariner to die of the virus on an MSC ship.

USS Carter Hall  

The spokesperson declined to provide an exact number of sailors, citing Defense Department policy, but added that those infected were "being checked on each day by their leadership [and] receiving deliveries of food and essential items".

At the time, the ship was docked in Virginia at Joint Expeditionary Base Little Creek–Fort Story, its home base. Most of the roughly 400 crew members were brought ashore while the ship was being sanitized.

USS San Diego  

On , The San Diego Union-Tribune reported that sailors of the American amphibious transport dock  had stated, on condition of anonymity, that at least five sailors from their ship had tested positive for the virus during the preceding few days. The sailors had been interviewed by the Union-Tribune presumably regarding a fire aboard American amphibious assault ship .  In response, a spokesperson for the US Navy confirmed that two sailors who were part of the firefighting effort had tested positive for the virus.

The two sailors had shown symptoms of the disease.  One was part of a crew fighting the fire, and the other had been acting as support. One sailor who fought in the fire stated that the fire had destroyed much of USS Bonhomme Richard firefighting gear, so the gear of nearby ships, including that of USS San Diego, was being used, and sailors fighting the fire often swapped gear with each other.  In addition, 27 close contacts had been identified and placed in quarantine.

USS George H.W. Bush  

On , Navy Times reported that a spokesperson for Naval Air Force Atlantic confirmed that a "small number" of sailors assigned to American aircraft carrier  had tested positive for the virus during the summer. The spokesperson declined to provide an exact number of sailors or a more precise date regarding when the virus was detected, citing Defense Department policy, but added that the carrier was not deployed at the time, and that those infected "remain[ed] in isolation at their private residences in Virginia and receive[d] daily medical supportive care". USS George H.W. Bush had been docked at Norfolk Naval Shipyard for maintenance since 2019.

USS Michael Murphy 

One quarter of the 300-member crew of USS Michael Murphy have been infected with COVID-19. The majority are asymptomatic, but remain in isolation. USS Michael Murphy was in port in Hawaii, as of 4 November 2020.

See also 

 COVID-19 pandemic on cruise ships
 COVID-19 pandemic in North America
 COVID-19 pandemic in Europe
 COVID-19 pandemic in Oceania
 Hospital ships designated for the COVID-19 pandemic

Notes

References 

Maritime incidents in 2020
 
naval ships